Me is the third album by Fiona Sit and was released on December 22, 2005. It contains seven tracks and an extensive mini-booklet containing pictures, writing, drawings, and personal blog entries by Fiona. It can be considered half autobiography and half album.

Track listing

 有隻雀仔 (There is a bird)
 尋找獨角獸 (Finding Unicorn)
 水 (Water)
 白色戀人 (White Love)
 愛 (Love)
 你在那裡 (Where are You)
 從金銀島寄來的信 (Letter from Treasure Island)

External links
 Album Information

Fiona Sit albums
2005 albums